Hubert Joseph Latham (13 September 1932 – 22 May 2017) was an English cricketer who played first-class cricket in 10 matches for Warwickshire between 1955 and 1959. He was born in Winson Green, Birmingham. 

Latham was a right-handed lower-order batsman and a right-arm fast bowler who played in first-class cricket as an amateur. He appeared in a couple of Warwickshire's less important first-class fixtures in 1955 and 1956, and was picked for another one of these non-County Championship games, against the Combined Services cricket team, early in the 1958 season: he took six second-innings wickets against what was a county-standard services team. He remained in the Warwickshire side for the six County Championship matches across May 1958 and took a few wickets in all of them, but then left the team and did not reappear, except in a single non-Championship game 14 months later in July 1959. He also appeared in occasional second eleven matches through to 1964.

References

1932 births
2017 deaths
English cricketers
Warwickshire cricketers
Cricketers from Birmingham, West Midlands